Friedrich Preller the Elder (25 April 1804 in Eisenach – 23 April 1878 in Weimar) was a German landscape painter and etcher. From 1832 he was a professor at the Fürstlichen freien Zeichenschule in Weimar. He was the father of the artist Friedrich Preller the Younger.

Life
He was born at Eisenach.  After studying drawing at Weimar, he went in 1821, on Goethe's advice, to Dresden, where in 1824 he was invited to accompany the grand duke of Weimar to Belgium. He became a pupil in the academy at Antwerp. From 1827 to 1831 he studied in Italy, and in 1831 received an appointment in the Weimar school of art.

In 1834–1836 he executed in tempera six pictures on subjects taken from the Odyssey in the Roman House at Leipzig, in 1836–1837 the landscapes with scenes from Oberon in the Wieland room in the grand-ducal Schloss at Weimar, and in 1836–1848 six frescoes on Thuringian subjects commissioned by the grand duchess.

In 1840 he visited Norway and produced a number of easel works, some of which are preserved at Weimar. In 1859 he revisited Italy, and on his return in 1861 he completed for the grand-ducal museum the frescoes illustrative of the Odyssey, which are held to constitute his chief claim to fame. He returned to Weimar, where he died.

References

Further reading 
 
 Julius Gensel: Friedrich Preller d. Ä., Bielefeld u.a. 1904 Digitalisierte Ausgabe
 Friedrich Preller der Jüngere, Max Jordan (ed.): Tagebücher des Künstlers (Diaries of the Artists), Kaufbeuren, 1904 Munich
 Ina Weinrautner: Friedrich Preller d. Ä.(1804–1878) Leben und Werk. Münster 1997,

External links 

 
 
 Preller Galerie in the Weimar Museum
 Odyssey-Landscapes
 Weimar Painting & Drawing School 

1804 births
1878 deaths
19th-century German painters
19th-century German male artists
German male painters
Royal Academy of Fine Arts (Antwerp) alumni